Barbora Seemanová (born 1 April 2000) is a Czech swimmer. She competed in the women's 200 metre freestyle event at the 2016 Summer Olympics.

References

External links
 

 
 

2000 births
Living people
Place of birth missing (living people)
Czech female freestyle swimmers
Czech female swimmers
Sportspeople from Prague
Swimmers at the 2015 European Games
European Games competitors for Kosovo
Olympic swimmers of the Czech Republic
Swimmers at the 2016 Summer Olympics
Swimmers at the 2018 Summer Youth Olympics
Youth Olympic gold medalists for the Czech Republic
European Aquatics Championships medalists in swimming
Swimmers at the 2020 Summer Olympics
21st-century Czech women